Opp Amaryllis! (Up, Amaryllis!) is one of the Swedish poet and performer Carl Michael Bellman's songs from his 1791 collection, Fredman's Songs, where it is No. 31. The song is a graceful pastorale in rococo style, involving a sleeping nymph who is invited to come fishing upon the sea's stormy wave. In reality, the nymph is a Swedish woman, Wilhelmina Norman, the stormy wave is a Swedish waterway, and the progression from shore to fishing-boat can equally well be read as a seduction. It is one of Bellman's best-known and best-loved songs, and has been recorded by musicians including Folke Andersson and Edvard Andreasson.

Context

The eponymous character Amaryllis is taken from classical tales. In Ancient Greek literature, Theocritus's Idylls portray a goatherd singing a serenade outside the cave of the nymph Amaryllis. In Ancient Roman literature, Amaryllis was a heroine in Virgil's Eclogues, a suite of pastoral poems.

Song

Melody and verse form 

The song is in  time and is marked Menuetto. It has 4 verses, each consisting of 11 lines; lines 2-7 are short. The rhyming pattern of each verse is AA-B-CCC-B-DDD-B. No source has been identified for the melody, which may well have been composed by Bellman himself.

Lyrics 

The song, headed "Om fiskafänget" ("About catching fish"), is dated 1773, and was written for Bellman's opera Fiskarena.
The song invites the sleeping nymph, in reality Wilhelmina Norman (who Bellman courted in the summer of 1773), to awaken and come fishing. The waterways, too, are Swedish, with familiar fish like pike.

Reception and legacy

The Bellman scholar Lars Lönnroth calls the song a graceful pastorale in rococo style. He notes that people have taken his pastoral songs, of which this is "the best known", as completely conventional works following the classical template of a shepherd-poet in pursuit of his fair nymph. It indeed begins, Lönnroth writes, as an aubade or morning song, like a medieval Provençal troubadour's. The young fisherman wakens his beloved and, in the first stanza, asks her to come fishing with him in an Arcadian landscape peopled with mythic figures, including Morpheus the god of sleep and Neptune, god of the sea. In the next stanza, he bids her dress herself; in the third, to fetch her fishing-tackle, and in the last stanza to climb into his boat. This plays out as a simple sequence of theatrical scenes. But, writes Lönnroth, it can equally well be read as a seduction. The last stanza drops the pretence of going out to catch pike, and states openly that "Love shall rule/In our chests." The seascape, too, he writes, has suddenly changed from calm to stormy; but the shepherd sings that he can find comfort "In thy calm embrace." Lönnroth observes that in Fredman's Epistle No. 25, "Blåsen nu alla", Bellman goes further into full-blown grotesque, sharply contrasting the classical imagery with the drunken orgiastic reality; but in "Opp Amaryllis!", the poet shows his skill in creating drama from a simple shepherd-poem, and undermining the pastoral with discreet hints of storms and death.

Bellman's biographer Paul Britten Austin describes the song as "one of his most delightful, and for many years [it] was far and away the most popular. It goes to a charming air." "Opp Amaryllis!" was recorded in 1924 by Folke Andersson and Edvard Andreasson for HMV. More recently, the song has been recorded many times; it was among the Bellman songs recorded in 1960 by Roland Bengtsson and Folke Sällström, and in 1988 by the actor Mikael Samuelson. The song was recorded in English by Martin Best in 1995.

References

Sources

 
 
 
 
  (with facsimiles of sheet music from first editions in 1790, 1791)

External links 

 Text of Song 31 at Bellman.net

1791 compositions
Swedish songs
Fredmans sånger